Robert Denham Nigel "Robin" Topham (born 17 July 1952) is an English former first-class cricketer.

Topham was born at Trowbridge in July 1952. He was educated at Shrewsbury School and the Australian National University, and later studied at St Edmund Hall, Oxford where he played first-class cricket for Oxford University in 1976. He made four first-class appearances for Oxford, against county opposition in the form of Glamorgan, Warwickshire and Sussex, in addition to playing against Cambridge University in The University Match. He scored 91 runs in his four matches, at an average of 15.16 and with a highest score of 31. 

Topham is a mathematics teacher at King's College, Auckland.

References

External links

1952 births
Living people
People from Trowbridge
People educated at Shrewsbury School
Australian National University alumni
Alumni of St Edmund Hall, Oxford
English cricketers
Oxford University cricketers
Schoolteachers from Wiltshire